The Pyramids were a surf group from Long Beach, California, United States, who formed in 1961. In early 1964, they made the Top 20 of the Billboard Hot 100 with their instrumental "Penetration". It proved to be the final major instrumental surf hit.

History
The band started in 1961 and was made up of five students from Poly High. All of them played some rock n roll. The members were Skip Mercier on lead and rhythm guitar, Ron McMullen on drums, Tom Pitman on sax, Willie Glover on rhythm guitar and Steve Leonard on bass. Drake Jenkins replaced Ron on drums in 1964. The group got their first break at a San Bernardino dance which a local radio station had sponsored. After the show some of the dancers and deejays suggested that they record an infectious number that people would like to hear repeated. Steve Leonard composed a number which was to become "Penetration".

Career
The group was approached by John Hodge who offered to manage and record them. He took them to Garrison Studios in Long Beach and they cut two sides. The single "Pyramid's Stomp" only sold a handful of copies due to the lack of promotion and airplay. After that they played the record hops and school dances. They recorded a single with "Here Comes Marsha" as the A side and the "Penetration" as the B side. It was originally called "Eyeballs", it was based on "Pipeline" by The Chantays. It's possible that the interest in "Penetration" started due to a Riverside DJ not playing the Will Glover composed A side "Here Comes Marsha" but instead playing the flip side "Penetration". With this single, their manager Hodge managed to secure local airplay. He also got national distribution with the London Records label. 

By February 22, 1964, their Original Penetration album was released on Best BR 16501 with Billboard mentioning "Penetration" as receiving singles attention, and "Louie Louie", "Out of Limits" and "Road Runnah" as other danceable tunes. By March 7, the album was in the Breakout albums New Action LPs section which showed the non-charting albums which were getting major attention by dealers in major markets. By March 28, it was in the Billboard TOP LP's chart at #121, having moved up 9 notches from the previous week's position of 130. By April 4, it was at #119. On the 11th of April it was at its fifth week in the chart and had moved down to #120.

The "Penetration" single spent a total of ten weeks in the charts, peaking at #18 on the week of April 4, 1964. There was also some small success with the B side."Here Comes Marsha" was a regional hit in Texas thanks to deejays playing that side. 

In July 1964, the group appeared in the American International Pictures' film Bikini Beach which starred Frankie Avalon and Annette Funicello.

For the film they performed two songs - “Record Run” and the instrumental "Bikini Drag", both written by Gary Usher and Roger Christian.

Later years
After The Pyramids, three of the band's members, Skip Mercier, Steve Leonard and Will Glover joined Long Beach musicians, Mike Marchman, Jim Foelber and Chris Myers and played in a club band called The Family Cat. They played around Orange County in the nightclubs until 1973.

In 1995, Sundazed Records released a 20 track CD Penetration! The Best of the Pyramids. Bob Irwin from the label (who had worked closely with music director for The Revels, Tony Hilder and band members Sam Eddy and Norman Knowles to get their work re-released in later years) did the same with this compilation. He was pleased to find John Hodge, the manager and producer for the Pyramids, because Hodge owned the masters for the original recordings which included unissued music. Hodge also had a strong love of the music.  Irwin was also planning a second release of their work. It was to be an album of unreleased material.

Drummer Ron McMullen died on January 7, 2015, in Long Beach, California.

Production and management
In addition to managing The Pyramids, John Hodge also produced their work. But other people were involved in the production such as Larry Wilson who co-produced with Hodge, the single Midnight Run" bw "Custom Caravan". Also, the material for The Pyramids in the film Bikini Beach was produced by Gary Usher. Hodge and Wilson had worked with other bands such as Wee Willie & The Pals with production of their 1964 single "We’re Gonna Dance" / "Teardrop Strawberry Soda". Hodge produced The Daisy Chain album, Straight Or Lame which was released in 1967.

Discography

Other countries

References

External links
 
 

Surf music groups
Instrumental rock musical groups
Rock music groups from California
Musical groups established in 1961
Musical groups disestablished in 1965
Musical groups from California
1961 establishments in California